Ciro Durán (16 December 1937 – 10 January 2022) was a Colombian screenwriter and film director. He died in Tobia on 10 January 2022, at the age of 84.

Filmography
La paga (1962)
 (1968)
Corralejas de Sincelejo (1976)
Tayrona. Codirigido con Joyce Ventura (1977)
Gamín (1977)
Niños de dos mundos (1979)
Las cuatro edades del amor (1980)
 (1985)
Tropical Snow (1988)
Comment vont les enfants (1990)
 (1996)
 (2000)

Awards
Best New Director at the San Sebastián International Film Festival (1979)

References

1937 births
2022 deaths
Colombian documentary filmmakers
Colombian film directors
People from Norte de Santander Department